Oktyabrskoye is a rural locality (a selo) and the administrative centre of Oktyabrsky Selsoviet, Sterlitamaksky District, Bashkortostan, Russia. The population was 977 as of 2010. There are 11 streets.

Geography 
Oktyabrskoye is located 31 km west of Sterlitamak (the district's administrative centre) by road. Severnaya is the nearest rural locality.

References 

Rural localities in Sterlitamaksky District